Barack Obama presidential campaign endorsements may refer to:

List of Barack Obama presidential campaign endorsements, 2008
List of Barack Obama presidential campaign endorsements, 2012